Penthea is a genus of longhorn beetles of the subfamily Lamiinae, containing the following species:

 Penthea adamsae McKeown, 1938
 Penthea costata Pascoe, 1863
 Penthea intricata Pascoe, 1864
 Penthea lichenosa McKeown, 1942
 Penthea macularia Pascoe, 1867
 Penthea mastersi Blackburn, 1897
 Penthea melanosticta Pascoe, 1875
 Penthea militaris Pascoe, 1863
 Penthea pardalina Breuning, 1942
 Penthea pardalis (Newman, 1842)
 Penthea pullina Pascoe, 1863
 Penthea saga (Pascoe, 1865)
 Penthea scenica Pascoe, 1863
 Penthea solida Pascoe, 1863
 Penthea tigrina Blackburn, 1901
 Penthea vermicularia (Donovan, 1805)

References

Pteropliini